The men's C-1 1000 metres event was an open-style, individual canoeing event conducted as part of the Canoeing at the 1996 Summer Olympics program.

Medallists

Results

Heats
18 competitors were entered. The top two finishers in each heat moved on to the final with the others relegated to the semifinals.

Semifinals
The top two finishers in each semifinal and the fastest third-place finisher advanced to the final.

Final
The final took place on August 3.

Doktor led from start to finish.

References
1996 Summer Olympics official report Volume 3. p. 173. 
Sports-reference.com 1996 C-1 1000 m results.
Wallechinsky, David and Jaime Loucky (2008). "Canoeing: Men's Canadian Singles 1000 Meters". In The Complete Book of the Olympics: 2008 Edition. London: Aurum Press, Limited. p. 481.

Men's C-1 1000
Men's events at the 1996 Summer Olympics